Against the Current is a 2009 American drama film released by Ambush Entertainment directed by Peter Callahan and starring Joseph Fiennes, Pell James, Justin Kirk, Elizabeth Reaser, Martin Shakar, Michelle Trachtenberg, and Mary Tyler Moore (in her final film role).

Plot
Paul Thompson (Joseph Fiennes) is a writer who lost his wife and child a few years back. He and his best friend, Jeff (Justin Kirk), have talked about swimming the length of the Hudson River since they were kids. Paul asks Jeff to come along with him on his trip to finally swim the river. Jeff agrees and brings along one of his friends, Liz (Elizabeth Reaser). Paul is determined to reach the end of the river by a certain date, August 28.

Jeff and Liz have no idea the importance of the date Paul has chosen until they realize that the date they are supposed to finish the swim is the anniversary of his family's death. Paul tells them that on that date, he is planning on killing himself. Paul's confession causes Jeff to remember a moment about five years ago when he saved Paul from committing suicide. Jeff told him that he should wait five years and if he still wanted to end his life, he would support him in it. Now, five years later, Jeff and Liz have to decide whether they should let Paul continue with his plan or try to convince him to keep living.

Cast
 Joseph Fiennes as Paul Thompson
 Justin Kirk as Jeff Kane
 Elizabeth Reaser as Liz Clark
 Michelle Trachtenberg as Suzanne
 Pell James as Amy Thompson
 Constance Barron as Aunt Karen
 Amy Hargreaves as Sarah Kane
 Mary Tyler Moore as Liz's Mom
 Samantha Sherman as Katie
 Martin Shakar as Boatyard Owner
 Avery Glymph as Fisherman #1
 Chad Brigockas as Fisherman #2
 Tom O'Rourke as Dock Man #1
 John Rue as Dock Man #2
 Douglas Odell as Dock Man #3
 Seth Kanor as Officer Lefurgy
 Nimo Gandhi as Pasthule
 Maggie Brown as Little Girl on Waterfront
 Perry Callahan as Older Girl on Waterfront

References

External links
 
 

2009 films
American drama films
2000s English-language films
2000s American films